The Texas Terror is a 1925 American silent Western film directed by J.P. McGowan and starring Al Hoxie and Ione Reed.

Cast
 Al Hoxie 
 Ione Reed
 Edward Burns 
 George B. Williams
 Toy Gallagher
 Bob Fleming
 Gordon Sackville  
 Harry Tenbrook
 Mike Donovan

References

Bibliography
 Katchmer, George A. A Biographical Dictionary of Silent Film Western Actors and Actresses. McFarland, 2015.
 McGowan, John J. J.P. McGowan: Biography of a Hollywood Pioneer. McFarland, 2005.

External links
 

1925 films
1925 Western (genre) films
American black-and-white films
Films directed by J. P. McGowan
Silent American Western (genre) films
1920s English-language films
1920s American films